Alato was an Italian motorcycle manufacturer from 1923 to 1925. Established by brothers Filio and Giulio Gosio in Turin, the Alato was powered by a 131cc two-stroke engine.

See also 

List of Italian companies
List of motorcycle manufacturers

References

Defunct motor vehicle manufacturers of Italy
Defunct motorcycle manufacturers of Italy